Ölcələr (also, Olcalar, Kuybyshev, Ol’dzhalyar, and Ülcälär) is a village and municipality in the Imishli Rayon of Azerbaijan.  It has a population of 498.

References 

Populated places in Imishli District